Unseeded Tamarine Tanasugarn successfully defended her title, by defeating Yanina Wickmayer 6–3, 7–5 in the final.

Seeds

Draw

Finals

Top half

Bottom half

References

External links
Main Singles draw
Qualifying draw

Ordina Open - Women's Singles
Ordina Open - Women's Singles
Rosmalen Grass Court Championships